Amjad Waleed Hussein (born 9 November 1993) is an Iraqi footballer who plays as a left-winger or left-back.

International career
On August 26, 2015, Waleed made his first international cap with Iraq against Lebanon in a friendly match.

Honours

Club
Duhok
 Iraqi Premier League: 2009–10
Al-Shorta
 Iraqi Premier League: 2018–19
 Iraqi Super Cup: 2022

References

External links
 

1993 births
Living people
Association football midfielders
Iraqi footballers
Iraq international footballers
Sportspeople from Baghdad
Al-Shorta SC players